Jardin may refer to:

Places
Jardin, Isère, a village in Isère, France
Le Jardin, a village in Corrèze, France
Jardin, Colombia, a town in Antioquia

Family name
Alexandre Jardin (born 1965), French writer and film director
Frédéric Jardin (born 1968), French film director
Nicolas-Henri Jardin (1720–1799), French architect, introduced neoclassicism to Danish architecture
Pascal Jardin (1934–1980), French screenwriter
Véronique Jardin (born 1966), French Olympic swimmer

See also 
Dujardin
Jardine